Kimberly Ann Bassett is an American civil servant serving as secretary of the District of Columbia. Bassett was appointed by Washington, D.C. Mayor Muriel Bowser in December 2018, succeeding Lauren Vaughan.

Education 
Bassett earned a Bachelor of Arts from North Carolina Central University and a Master of Arts from North Carolina A&T State University.

Career 
Prior to assuming her role as secretary, Bassett worked in Muriel Bowser's mayoral administration as an advisor and director of the mayor's office on women’s policy and initiatives. Bassett previously worked as the executive director of CTIA and director of external affairs for C&P Telephone. Bassett also worked as an appointee in the United States Department of Education during the Clinton administration and for the Democratic Party.

References

External links

20th-century births
Living people
North Carolina A&T State University alumni
North Carolina Central University alumni
Secretaries of the District of Columbia
Washington, D.C., Democrats
Women in Washington, D.C., politics
Year of birth missing (living people)
21st-century American women politicians
21st-century American politicians